In mathematics, an element p of a partial order (P, ≤) is a meet prime element when p is the principal element of a principal prime ideal. Equivalently, if P is a lattice, p ≠ top,  and for all a, b in P, 
a∧b ≤ p implies a ≤ p or b ≤ p.

See also 
 Join and meet

References
.

Order theory